Amastridium sapperi, the rusty-headed snake, is a species of snake in the family Colubridae. The species is found in Honduras, Guatemala, Mexico, and Belize.

References

Amastridium
Reptiles of Honduras
Reptiles of Guatemala
Reptiles of Mexico
Reptiles of Belize
Reptiles described in 1903
Taxa named by Franz Werner